is the first greatest hits album by Japanese girl idol group S/mileage. It was released on 30 May 2012 on the label Hachama.

Release 
The album was released in 2 versions: a regular edition and a limited edition. The limited edition contained an additional DVD.

The album contains 15 tracks on the CD: the first 14 tracks are, in reverse chronological order, 14 songs that were originally released on the A-sides of the group's first 14 singles (4 indie singles and 10 major-label singles), and the 15th track is a new song.

Reception 
The album debuted at number 13 in the Japanese Oricon weekly albums chart.

Track listing

Charts

References

External links 
 Profile of the album on the official website of Hello! Project
 Profile of the album on the official website of Up-Front Works

Angerme albums
2012 compilation albums
Hachama albums
Japanese-language albums